The 2020 Apulian regional election took place in Apulia, Italy, on 20 and 21 September. It was originally scheduled to take place on May 31, 2020, but it was delayed due to the coronavirus pandemic in Italy.

Electoral system 

The electoral law is established by the Regional Law n. 7/2015. The regional council is made up of 50 councilors, plus the president; The first 23 seats are divided at the district level and the remaining 27 at the level of the single regional constituency. The law provides for a single round, with list voting, the possibility of expressing two preferences of different gender within the chosen list, and voting for the candidate for president, on a single ballot. It is possible to vote for a slate and a candidate for the chair that are not connected to each other ("split vote").

The candidate who obtains the majority (even only relative) of the votes is elected President of the Region. The lists linked to the elected president are eventually assigned a majority bonus in the following measure: at least 29 seats if the elected president has obtained a percentage of preferences higher than 40%; at least 28 seats if the elected president has obtained a percentage of preferences between 35% and 40%, while if it falls below 35%, at least 27 councilors will be assigned. The law provides for a threshold of 8% for coalitions and lists that run on their own and 4% for lists that present themselves in a coalition.

Background 
On January 12, 2020, the Democratic Party (PD) held its primaries in which Governor Michele Emiliano was the winner. 

Following the primaries' victory of Emiliano, considered by Italia Viva (IV) too close to the political positions of the Five Star Movement (M5S), Matteo Renzi announced that his party will run separately from the center-left coalition. Other centrist parties like More Europe and Action welcomed Renzi's call. Action had supported the candidacy of Fabiano Amati in the PD's primaries.

After the pre-electoral agreements between the three parties of the center-right coalition, Brothers of Italy announced that the candidate in the region will be Raffaele Fitto, MEP and former governor of Apulia. However, the decision was opposed by the Salento section of the League, which instead proposed Nuccio Altieri. The final choice will be determined by the outcome of the regional elections in Emilia-Romagna and Calabria which could upset the balance between the center-right forces and therefore lead to a modification of pre-election agreements.

The M5S will hold the primaries on its electoral platform Rousseau. The candidates are Cristian Casili, Mario Conca, Antonella Laricchia and Antonio Trevisi.

Parties and candidates

Opinion polls

Candidates

Parties

Results

Turnout

See also 

 2020 Italian regional elections

References 

2020 elections in Italy
2020 regional election
2020
Elections postponed due to the COVID-19 pandemic